Dale Hagerman (August 5, 1927 – October 9, 2017) was an American pharmacist and businessman, and co-founder of Diplomat Pharmacy with his son Phil Hagerman.

Early life
Dale Hagerman was born on August 5, 1927 in Flint, Michigan, one of eight children of Ray and Mildred (Stocking) Hagerman.

Hagerman received a bachelor's degree in pharmacy from Ferris State College.

Career
He was a partner in Ideal Pharmacy which had four stores in Flint, Michigan. In 1975, he sold his stake, bought a store in Flushing Road, and founded Diplomat Pharmacy  with his son, Phil, who was about to graduate from college. It is now the largest speciality pharmacy chain in the US.

Personal life
On August 20, 1949, he married Janet Huston in Fenton, Michigan.

They had five children.

He died on October 9, 2017 at his home in Fenton Township Michigan, aged 90.

References

1927 births
2017 deaths
People from Flint, Michigan
Businesspeople from Michigan
Ferris State University alumni
American company founders
American pharmacists
20th-century American businesspeople